Khamti language is a Southwestern Tai language spoken in Myanmar and India by the Khamti people.

Demographics
In Burma, Khamti is spoken by 3,500 in Sagaing Region, near Myitkyina and by 4,500 in Kachin State, Putao District (both reported in 2000).  In India, it is spoken by 5,000 in Assam and Arunachal Pradesh, in the Dikrong Valley, Narayanpur, and north bank of the Brahmaputra (reported in 2007).

Three dialects of Khamti are known: North Burma Khamti, Assam Khamti, and Sinkaling Khamti.  All speakers of Khamti are bilingual, largely in Assamese and Burmese.

Name
"Khamti" has been variously rendered Hkamti, Khampti, Khamti Shan, Khampti Shan, Khandi Shan, Kam Ti, Tai Kam Ti, Tai-Khamti, Kamti, Hkampti Shan, and Khampti Sam. The name "Khamti" means "place of gold".

History
The language seems to have originated around Mogoung in Upper Burma. Mung Kang was captured, a large group of Khamtis moved to the north and east of Lakhimpur.  In the year 1850, 300–400 Khamtis settled in Assam.

Phonology

Initial consonants
Khamti has the following initial consonants:

Note: only the variety found in Myanmar uses the palatal nasal /ɲ/ and the rhotic /r/.

Final consonants
Khamti has the following final consonants:

-[w] occurs after front vowels and [a]-, -[j] occurs after back vowels and [a]-.

Vowels
The Khamti language as found in Myanmar uses the following vowels:

Tones
Khamti uses five tones, namely: low falling /21/, mid rising /34/, mid falling /42/, high falling /53/~[33], and high level /55/~[44].

Grammar

Syntax
Unlike other Tai languages that display SVO word order, Khamti has SOV word order.

Nouns
Nouns are divided into common nouns and proper nouns.

Common nouns
Common nouns can pluralized by adding /nai1 khau/ behind the noun. Common nouns are class categorized by using classifiers such as the generic /an3/, /ko1/ for people and /to1/ for animals.

Proper nouns
People's names and place names are classified as proper nouns. Khamti prefixes people's names, depending on the social class or status of that person. These prefixes are gender specific. The prefix for Miss is /na:ng4/ and the prefix for Mr is /tsa:i3/. A prefix for Mr used to respectfully address a male of higher status is /tsau2/ or /tsau2 nuai/.

Pronouns
Khamti uses a triparte pronoun system, consisting of singular, dual and plural forms. The dual form and the first person plural form are further divided between inclusive and exclusive forms. The following set of pronouns are the pronouns found in the Khamti language:

Demonstratives
Khamti uses the following demonstratives:

Writing system

The Tai Khamtis have their own writing system called 'Lik-Tai', which they share with the Tai Phake people and Tai Aiton people. It closely resembles the Northern Shan script of Myanmar, which is a variant of the Mon–Burmese script, with some of the letters taking divergent shapes. Their script is evidently derived from the Lik Tho Ngok script since hundreds of years ago. There are 35 letters including 17 consonants and 14 vowels. The script is traditionally taught in monasteries on subjects like Tripitaka, Jataka tales, code of conduct, doctrines and philosophy, history, law codes, astrology, and palmistry etc. The first printed book was published in 1960. In 1992 it was edited by the Tai Literature Committee, Chongkham. In 2003 it was again modified with tone marking by scholars of Northern Myanmar and Arunachal Pradesh.

Consonants
 က - ka - k - [k]
 ၵ - kha - kh - [kʰ]
 ꩠ - ga - g - [g]
 ၷ - gha - gh - [gʱ]
 င - nga - ng - [ŋ]
 ꩡ - ca - c - [t͡ʃ], [t͡s]
 ꩢ - cha - ch - [t͡ʃʰ]
 ꩣ - ja - j - [ɟ]
 ꩤ - jha - jh - [ɟʱ]
 ꩥ - nya - ny - [ɲ]
 ꩦ - ṭa - ṭ - [ʈ]
 ꩧ - ṭha - ṭh - [ʈʰ]
 ꩨ - ḍa - ḍ - [ɖ]
 ꩩ - ḍha - ḍh - [ɖʱ]
 ၼ - ṇa - ṇ - [ɳ]
 တ - ta - t - [t]
 ထ - tha - th - [tʰ]
 ၻ - da - d - [d]
 ꩪ - dha - dh - [dʱ]
 ꩫ - na - n - [n]
 ပ - pa - p - [p]
 ၸ - pha - ph - [pʰ]
 ၿ - ba - b - [b]
 ၹ - bha - bh - [bʱ]
 မ - ma - m - [m]
 ယ - ya - y - [j]
 ꩳ or ရ - ra - r - [r~ɹ]
 ြ ([ɾ]) medially, such as ၸြႃ (phraa, "Buddha")
 လ - la - l - [l]
 ဝ - wa - w - [w~v]
 ꩬ - sa - s - [s]
 ꩭ - ha - h - [h]
 ꩮ - ḷa - ḷ - [ɭ]
 ꩯ - fa - f - [f]
 ꩲ - za - z - [z]
 ꩱ - xa - x - [x]
 ꩴ - oay - oay - [oaʲ]
 ꩵ - qn - qn - [qⁿ]
 ꩶ - hm - hm - [mʰ]
 ဢ - a - a - [ʔ]

Vowels
 ႊ - a - [a]
 ၢ - ā, aa - [aː]
 ႃ - ā - [aː]
 ိ - i - [i]
 ီ - ī - [iː]
 ု - u - [u]
 ူ - ū - [uː]
 ေ - e - [eː]
 ူဝ် - o - [oː]
 ဲ - ai - [ai]
 ၢဲ - aai - [aːi]
 ဝ် - au - [au]
 ်ွ - au - [au]
 ၢဝ် - aau - [aːu]
 ံ - aṁ - [(a)ŋ̊]
 ႄ - ae - [ɛ]
 ေႃ - aw - [ɔ]
 ွ - aw - [ɔ]
  ိဝ် - iu - [iu]
 ႅ - ia - [ia]
  ႅဝ် - iau - [iau]
 ျႃ - iaa - [iaː]
 ိူ - oe - [ɤ]
 ွဲ - oi - [oi]
  ွ - ua - [ua]
 ဴွ - uai - [uai]
 ွႃ - uaa - [uaː]
 ေူ - ui - [ui]
 ို - ue - [ɯ]
  ိုဝ် - uee - [ɯː]
  ုဝ် - uo - [wo]
 ႂ် - aue - [aɯ]
 ိုဝ် - uea - [ɯa]

Tones and other diacritics
Displaying with the dummy letter ဢ,

 tone 1 [21]:
 for checked syllable, including single consonant - ဢႉ
 for else - ဢႇ
 tone 2 [34] - ဢႛ
 tone 3 [42] - ဢႈ
 tone 4 [53] - ဢး - In speaking, it may become [33].
 tone 5:
 for short open syllable - ဢႚ [44] (rare usage)
 for else - ဢ [55] (unmarked)
 ဢ် - asat - final consonant, silences inherent vowel
  ꩰ - duplication

Further reading
 Thai Khamti Grammar
 Inglis, Douglas. (forthcoming) Khamti Shan anti-ergative construction: a Tibeto-Burman influence? Linguistics of the Tibeto-Burman Area. 40(2).
 Inglis, Douglas. 2014. This here thing: Specifying Morphemes an3, nai1, and mai2 in Tai Khamti Reference-point Constructions. PhD Dissertation. The University of Alberta.
 Inglis, Douglas. 2013. Oral stop consonants in Tai Khamti: An acoustic study in voice onset time. Paper presented at ISCTLL46. Dartmouth College.
 Inglis, Douglas. 2013. Deictic mai2 'here' as an object marker in Khamti Shan: A Tibeto-Burman influence in Tai?. Paper presented at ISCTLL46. Dartmouth College.
 Inglis, Douglas. 2004. Preliminary report: Khamti Shan wordlist and lexicostatistical results. Payap University. Chiang Mai.

References

External links
 The Khamti language at Omniglot
 Mung huw Tai Khamti Song
 Tai-Khamti Song - Tai-Khamti Girls
 Tai-Khamti Talk
 Words of Life Khamti People/Language Movie Trailer
 Tai Khamti Song - Mung hau
 Tai Khamti Song - panlong sau

Languages of Myanmar
Languages of Assam
Southwestern Tai languages
Languages of Arunachal Pradesh